The next elections to the French Senate are scheduled for September 2023.

References

See also 
Elections in France

Future elections in France
Senate (France) elections
Senate